Henry Peter Bosse (1844–1903) was a German-American photographer, cartographer and civil engineer.

Biography
1844: Henry Peter Bosse is born November 13 at his father's estate, Sonnedorf in Prussian Saxony, where he spends his childhood. Little is known about Bosse's early life and education in Germany, although his surviving family asserts some connection to Abraham Bosse (1620–1676), the famous French engraver and topography theorist. Henry Peter Bosse claimed to be the grandson of Count August Neidhardt von Gneisenau.
1870: Henry Peter Bosse settles in Chicago upon emigrating to the United States. He finds employment in the stationery business. By the 1880s Bosse is employed as a draughtsman and cartographer with the Army Corps of Engineers at Rock Island, Illinois. Between 1882 and 1892 he photographs the upper Mississippi River with a passion for the land and the place.
1893: Henry Peter Bosse publishes his large format Views on the Mississippi River between Minneapolis, Minn and St. Louis, Mo. 1883–1891 as bound albums of meticulous, blue cyanotypes. One of these albums came into the possession of Alexander Mackenzie, Army Corps Chief of Engineers. Each of the 169 Mackenzie album cyanotypes is printed using an oval mask, and each is titled by Bosse in hand-written ink.
1894–95: Henry Peter Bosse's album Views on the Mississippi River between Minneapolis, Minn and St. Louis, Mo. 1883–1891 is shown at the World Columbian Exposition of 1893 in Chicago, a turning point in photographic history.

An artist
Henry Peter Bosse was a prescient photographer in that he foresaw and adhered to aesthetic values which have come to define the work of German photo-journalists around the world. Straightforward composition and a concern for the efforts of man characterize Bosse's photographic point of view, as it would come to be the basis of foto-reportage. Bosse took great care when making his presentation albums. He foresaw the need for color: the intense moody blues of his refined cyanotypes reflect this concern. His cyanotypes were exposed with large glass plates and printed on the finest French cyanotype paper, each sheet off-white measuring 14.5" x 17.2" and bearing the watermark Johannot et Cie. Annonay, aloe's satin. The albums are leather bound. Beyond technique, in his appreciation for railroad bridges and structural steel, Bosse stood at the forefront of German appreciation for photographic look books concerned with the hand of man, modern architecture and urban design.

An engineer and a cartographer
Henry Peter Bosse was one of the highest-paid technical people of his day in the United States. The 1880s were the beginning of structural steel buildings and cable suspension bridges like Röbling's Brooklyn Bridge (1883); at the time Bosse was a top engineer at the key point where railroads companies wanted to cross the wide Mississippi River. Bosse's photography assisted with his creation of the most accurate map yet made of the upper Mississippi which, in turn, facilitated the engineering of bridges, locks and levees. Several variants of his drawn maps exist, while his album of photographs, per se, may have been the first photographic map of a major river ever created.

In public collections
Since the Alexander Mackenzie album of Henry Bosse cyanotypes surfaced at a Sotheby's auction in 1990, Henry Bosse's cyanotype photographs have been included in the permanent collections at the J. Paul Getty Museum in Los Angeles. The San Francisco Museum of Modern Art in California, The New York Metropolitan Museum of Art, the Amon Carter Museum of Art in Texas, the Nelson-Atkins Museum of Art in Kansas City, Missouri, the National Museum of American Art in Washington D.C., and the Minneapolis Institute of Arts in Minnesota. The United States Army Corps of Engineers offices at Rock Island, Illinois and St. Paul, Minnesota, the Mayo Clinic in Rochester, Minnesota, the National Mississippi River Museum & Aquarium in Dubuque, Iowa, and elsewhere also retain Bosse photograph albums.  The Corp offices also have various Bosse photographs, charts/maps and ephemera.

An inventory
A inventory of known Henry Peter Bosse photographic views and print variants was first assembled by Bob Wiederanders of the Fred W. Woodward Riverboat Museum, Dubuque, Iowa.  Kenton Spading, P.E., U.S Army Corps of Engineers, St. Paul District, with the capable assistance of Roberta (Bobbie) Peterson, expanded the inventory.

References

American cartographers
American civil engineers
1844 births
1903 deaths
German emigrants to the United States
19th-century American photographers
19th-century German photographers
Photographers from Saxony